Walk On is the fourth studio album by the American rock band Boston, released on June 7, 1994 by MCA Records. It is the first album not to feature vocalist Brad Delp, though he did assist as a songwriter. Vocal duties were handled by Fran Cosmo, making this his first appearance on a Boston album. Delp and Cosmo shared leads during the album's supporting tour and the album’s follow-up Corporate America.

History
After the success of their 1986 album Third Stage, the band began planning a follow-up and writing for Walk On, which began in 1988. However, due to the increased friction and disagreements between bandleader Tom Scholz and singer-songwriter Brad Delp, the latter left the band in 1989 to join original Boston guitarist Barry Goudreau in forming a new band (named RTZ). Soon after, Fran Cosmo was hired and introduced as the new lead singer. Cosmo had previously worked with Goudreau in the band Orion the Hunter. So, effectively, Scholz and Goudreau swapped vocalists in their musical projects.

Delp returned to Boston to assist in the songwriting, and shared lead vocals on the subsequent Walk On Tour, though he did not sing on the album. Delp and Cosmo also shared leads on Boston's next album Corporate America.

After its release, Walk On peaked at No. 7 on the Billboard 200 and yielded the hit "I Need Your Love." It was certified platinum by the RIAA on September 8, 1994.

The final eight pages of the album's booklet were titled "Walk On — Against Violence and Cruelty", and dedicated to preventing domestic abuse and animal cruelty, providing contact information of numerous organizations, including the National Coalition Against Domestic Violence and the Humane Society. It was noted that Delp himself was a contributor to these causes.

Classic Rock critic Paul Elliott rated "Livin' for You" as Boston's 3rd greatest song of all time and as Boston's greatest ballad.

Track listing

 Tracks 4, 5, 6 and 7 are all part of one long song ("Walk On Medley"), but were indexed separately on the CD.
 On the LP release, "Get Organ-ized" was split across the two sides of the record, with the portion on Side Two named "Get Reorgan-ized".
 "Magdalene" was originally written by the Pennsylvania band Hybrid Ice.
 A live version of track 3, "Livin for You", was included on the band's next album, Corporate America.

Personnel

Boston 
 Fran Cosmo – lead vocals
 Tom Scholz – Yamaha CP-70 electric grand piano, organs, clavinet, keyboard strings, lead guitar, rhythm guitar, bass (1, 2, 8, 9, 10) drums (1, 8), handclaps, various effects, subsonic bass vocals, narratives
 Gary Pihl – lead guitar, rhythm guitar, handclaps, various effects 
 David Sikes – bass (3, 5, 6, 7) backing vocals
 Doug Huffman – drums (2, 3, 5, 6, 7, 9, 10)

Additional Personnel 
 Bob Cedro – rhythm guitar (10), handclaps
 Matt Belyea – handclaps
 Tommy Funderburk – backing vocals
 Michael Shotten – harmony vocals (1, 5)

Production 
 Tom Scholz – producer, engineer, arrangements
 Gary Pihl – associate producer, assistant engineer
 David Sikes – associate producer, assistant engineer
 Ted Jensen – mastering at Sterling Sound (New York, NY)
 Vartan Kurjian – art direction 
 Ron Larson – design, back cover illustrations
 Andy Engel – cover art concept
 Michael Bryan – cover illustrations

Charts

Certifications

References

Boston (band) albums
1994 albums
Albums produced by Tom Scholz
MCA Records albums